Ellesmere is a locality in the Selwyn District of New Zealand.

Located south of Rolleston, the locality has given its names to a number of features. Ellesmere ward is a large rural area within Selwyn District; two of Selwyn's ten district councillors are elected in that ward. Lake Ellesmere / Te Waihora, Canterbury's largest lake, is located south of Ellesmere. The Anglican Church has a parish called Ellesmere, and Walter Harper was its vicar from 1876 to 1882. The parliamentary Ellesmere electorate existed from 1861 to 1928.

References

Selwyn District
Populated places in Canterbury, New Zealand